Conus cuvieri, common name Cuvier's cone, is a species of sea snail, a marine gastropod mollusk in the family Conidae, the cone snails and their allies.

Like all species within the genus Conus, these snails are predatory and venomous. They are capable of "stinging" humans, therefore live ones should be handled carefully or not at all.

Description
The size of the shell varies between 17 mm and 51 mm. The thin shell is cylindrically inflated and, thin. It has a pale fawn color, with a few large white blotches, especially about the middle, and numerous close revolving lines of chestnut spots.

Distribution
This marine species occurs in the southern part of the Red Sea and in the Gulf of Aden.

References

 Tucker J.K. & Tenorio M.J. (2013) Illustrated catalog of the living cone shells. 517 pp. Wellington, Florida: MdM Publishing.
 Puillandre N., Duda T.F., Meyer C., Olivera B.M. & Bouchet P. (2015). One, four or 100 genera? A new classification of the cone snails. Journal of Molluscan Studies. 81: 1–23

External links
 The Conus Biodiversity website
 Cone Shells – Knights of the Sea
 

cuvieri
Gastropods described in 1858